Kazutoshi (written: 和寿, 和敏, 和俊, 幸俊 or 一年) is a masculine Japanese given name. Notable people with the name include:

, Japanese voice actor
, Japanese sumo wrestler
, Japanese molecular biologist
, Japanese cross-country skier
, Japanese musician
, Japanese politician
, Japanese shogi player

Japanese masculine given names